Perm State University (now Perm State National Research University; , ,  romanised:) or PSU, PSNRU (romanised:), is located in the city of Perm, Perm Krai, Russia. Founded in 1916, it claims to be one of the oldest universities in the Ural and eastern territories of Russia. Its current rector is Dmitriy Krasilnikov.

History
Perm State University was founded on 14 October 1916. Its origins lie in the opening of a branch of St. Petersburg University in the city of Perm. This decision of the Russian government was in tune with the strategy of the cultural and geopolitical development of the Urals economic region. The idea of a center of higher education in the Urals was supported by D.I. Mendeleev, A.S.Popov, D.N.Mamin-Sibiryak,  and other public figures.

A mass shooting occurred at the university on 20 September 2021, by a law student at the university, resulting in six deaths and 47 injuries.

After the 2022 Russian invasion of Ukraine, European and UK partners of the university took a break from student internships and programmes with them. The University of Oxford in the UK announced the suspension of preparations for the summer school.

Academics 
Today, the university includes 12 faculties, 77 departments and 2 branches. The total number of students was 11,432 in the 2010/2011 academic year, including 7,607 full-time students. The university provides training of scientific specialists in 56 postgraduate specializations (there are about 250 postgraduate students) and 6 doctoral specializations. There are 14 dissertation councils, including 11 councils for the defence of doctoral theses.

Academic activities were conducted by 1229 researchers in 2009, including 164 doctors of sciences, professors and 480 candidates of sciences, associate professors. The academic staff includes 4 academicians and 3 corresponding members of the Russian Academy of Sciences, 1 corresponding member of the Russian Academy of Education, 15 honoured science figures of the Russian Federation and 10 honoured workers of higher education of the Russian Federation. 10 academics hold the status of Distinguished Professor at Perm State University.

Perm State University cooperated with foreign partners and international organisations, within the framework of which professors and students of PSU are sent abroad on long-term, mutually agreed with programmes with universities in other countries and international organisations, Perm is visited by professors and students from other universities. Partners of the University are Oxford University (until 2022), many French university centres (University of Aix-Marseilles, Grenoble-Alpes, Nancy I, Paris III), universities in the USA (Louisville), Central European countries and Australia. The University cooperates with the European Commission, the World Bank, the Ministry of Science and Culture of Lower Saxony and several other organisations.

University rankings 
At the end of August 2018, PSU entered the ranking of the best universities in the Eurasian region, compiled by the British publication Times Higher Education, ranking 61-70.

According to the QS University Rankings: BRICS (Best BRICS Universities) study published on 8 July 2015, PSU was ranked 24th in the Russian list of leading higher education institutions, ahead of several universities with national research and federal research status.

Faculties
As of 2008, the university had 12 faculties:
Faculty of Mechanics and Mathematics
Faculty of Physics
Faculty of Chemistry
Faculty of Biology
Faculty of Geology
Faculty of Geography
Faculty of History and Politology
Faculty of Philology
Faculty of Philosophy and Sociology
Faculty of Economics
Faculty of Law
Faculty of Modern Foreign Languages and Literatures

Notable alumni and faculty 
 Vladimir Nikolayevich Beklemishev, Soviet zoologist and entomologist
 Nikita Belykh, Russian politician, former leader of the Union of Right Forces, currently governor of Kirov Oblast
 Abram Samoilovitch Besicovitch (Besikovitch) (1891–1970) was a Russian-Jewish mathematician, who worked mainly in England. He was appointed professor at the University of Perm in 1917.
 Elena Braverman, Russian, Israeli, and Canadian mathematician
 Leonid Brekhovskikh, Soviet-Russian oceanographist
 Georgi Burkov, Soviet film actor
 Sergei Chernikov, Russian mathematician
 Georgii Frederiks, Russian geologist
 Alexander Friedmann, Russian mathematician and cosmologist
 Vladimir Gelfand, Soviet soldier and diarist
 Nina Gorlanova, Russian novelist
 Boris Grekov, Soviet historian
 Alexander-Paul Henckel, Russian biologist. Founder of Perm State University Botanical gardens. Author of Brockhaus and Efron Encyclopedic Dictionary.
 Zulya Kamalova, Tatar singer currently residing in Australia
 Vladimir Kostitsyn, Russian geophysicist
 Yuri Alexandrovich Orlov, Russian and Soviet zoologist, paleontologist
 Vladimir Porfiriev, Soviet geologist
 Victor Pavlovich Protopopov, Ukrainian-Soviet psychiatrist
 Maxim Reshetnikov, Russian politician, Minister of Economic Development, former Governor of Perm Krai
 Boris Schwanwitsch, Russian-Soviet entomologist
 Grigory Abramovich Shajn, Russian-Soviet astronomer
 Nikolay Shaklein, Russian politician, former governor of Kirov Oblast
 Valentin Stepankov, the first prosecutor general of the Russian Federation
 Jacob Tamarkin, Russian-American mathematician
 Dmitry Rybolovlev, Russian cardiologist and oligarch
 George Vernadsky, Russian-American historian
 Ivan Matveyevich Vinogradov, Russian-Soviet mathematician
 Augustinas Voldemaras, first Prime Minister of Lithuania in 1918
 Leonid Yuzefovich, Russian writer
 Mark Zakharov, Soviet-Russian theatrical and film director

See also 
 List of modern universities in Europe (1801–1945)
List of universities in Russia

References

External links
Пермский государственный национальный исследовательский университет - Russian
Official Perm State University - English
彼尔姆国立大学，俄罗斯 - Chinese

Educational institutions established in 1916
Education in the Soviet Union
Universities and colleges in Perm, Russia
National research universities in Russia
1916 establishments in the Russian Empire